Marcello Craveri (23 March 1914 – 18 February 2002) was an Italian biblical scholar. Born in Turin, he earned his doctorate in 1940 and then saw military service.

His most widely read work probably is The Life of Jesus published in 1966, and in paperback English translation in 1967. On the biblical evidence, and the then-available evidence from the Dead Sea Scrolls, Craveri concluded that the claims to divinity made by the historical Jesus were strictly limited and not unusual for a Jew of that generation. Much of the stronger claims, and the emphasis on the redeeming power of Christ's death on the Cross, could be seen as reworkings by St. Paul, who was probably influenced strongly by the Graeco-Roman traditions.

References

Craveri, M (English translation 1967) The Life of Jesus; An assessment through modern historical evidence. Panther History
Craveri, M (1967) The Life of Jesus, Grove Press [translation of: La vita di Gesù, Feltrinelli Editore, Milano (1966)] https://www.amazon.com/Life-Jesus-Marcello-Craveri/dp/0880012382/
Mention of Marcello Craveri's death 

Writers from Turin
Italian male writers
1914 births
2002 deaths